The Housing Code of Russia is the prime source of Law of the Russian Federation concerning Housing matters. The previous Housing code of the Russian Federation was signed into law on 29 December 2004. It was subsequently amended on 22 December 2020.

Structure 
The Code consists of 10 sections, 19 chapters and 202 articles in its amended version.

Section I. General Provisions 
Chapter 1: Basic provisions. Housing legislation Chapter 2: Objects of housing laws. Housing stockChapter 3 Transfer of premises to non-residential premises and the non-residential premises to premises

Chapter 4: Conversion of and alterations to dwelling

Section II. Property Right and Other Corporeal Rights to Premises. 
Chapter 5: The rights and obligations of the owner of housing and other living room in its own citizens Chapter 6: Common property owners in an apartment house. General meeting of owners

Section III. Accommodations provided under contracts of social hiring 
Chapter 7: Reasons and procedure of the premises under the social contract of employment 
Chapter 8: Social rent premises

Section IV. Specialized housing 
Chapter 9 Dwellings specialized housing

Chapter 10: Provision of specialized premises and their use

Section V. Housing and housing co-operatives 
Chapter 11: Organization and operation of housing and housing co-operatives Chapter 12: The legal status of members of housing cooperatives

Section VI. Homeowners 
Chapter 13: Establishment and operation of homeowners Chapter 14: The legal status of members of the homeowners association

Section VII. Fee for housing and utilities

Section VIII. Management of apartment buildings 
The choice of a method for controlling a block of flats. General requirements for the management activities of an apartment house. Council block of flats. Contract management of the apartment house management of an apartment house, located in the state or municipal property Direct management of an apartment house owners of the premises in such a house Creating local government conditions for the management of apartment buildings

Section IX. Organization of a major overhaul of the common property in apartment buildings

See also

Code for Sustainable Homes

References 

Law of Russia